Chhanga Trikam Bijal is an Indian politician. He is a Member of the Gujarat Legislative Assembly from the Anjar Assembly constituency since 8 December 2022. He is a Member of the Bharatiya Janata Party.

References 

Living people
People from Kutch district
Bharatiya Janata Party politicians from Gujarat
Year of birth missing (living people)